David Williamson is a professional sleight-of-hand artist, magician, and author. David Britland of Genii magazine called him "an exceptional stage performer" and "a magician who changed the way we do magic." He was named Magician of the Year in 2017 by the Academy of the Magical Arts, and was named an Honorary Member of prestigious British association The Magic Circle.

Personal life 
Williamson was born in 1961 in Xenia, Ohio. His father was a farmer and factory worker. He became interested in magic as a child, studying and learning tricks from Henry Hay's book The Amateur Magician's Handbook and eventually becoming the assistant to a local magician who called himself Quacky the Clown. He met his future wife Marsha in high school by impressing her with a coin trick. They married during college. Williamson was an art major but dropped out, preferring to start a career as a magician. He and his wife have two children.

Career
While still in college and working as a dishwasher while performing in the evenings, Williamson won the 1981 Gold Cups International Award of Excellence in Close-up Performance, commonly regarded as the most prestigious "close-up" award in the International Brotherhood of Magicians competitions.

In 1984 he and his wife moved to Europe, where he performed frequently at conventions in England and elsewhere. In 1989 he wrote a book about his magic act, Williamson's Wonders, with Richard Kaufman. His comedic style began to earn him a reputation and further bookings, for corporate events and eventually a TV special called Champions of Magic. In the 2000s, he began performing regularly for Disney Cruise Lines.

He has recorded four instructional videos in magic and sleight-of-hand.

He played the ringmaster in the touring Broadway show Circus 1903, and performed with touring production The Illusionists.

Works
 Williamson's Wonders (written with Richard Kaufman, 1989)

Honors and awards
Besides the honors noted above, Williamson was named the Academy of the Magical Arts' Close-up Magician of the Year in 1989 and 1990, Lecturer Magician of the Year in 1990 and 1993, Parlour Magician of the Year in 1994, and received its Performing Fellowship in 2012.

References

External links
davidwilliamson.com Official David Williamson website

American magicians
Living people
1961 births
Academy of Magical Arts Magician of the Year winners
People from Ohio
Academy of Magical Arts Close-Up Magician of the Year winners
Academy of Magical Arts Lecturer of the Year winners
Academy of Magical Arts Parlour Magician of the Year winners
Academy of Magical Arts Performing Fellowship winners